A Baby Guinness is a shooter, a style of cocktail, or mixed alcoholic beverage, intended to be consumed in one shot. A Baby Guinness does not contain Guinness stout. Its name is derived from the fact that it is made in such a way as to look like a tiny glass of stout.

Preparation
A portion of coffee liqueur (e.g. Kahlúa or Tia Maria) is topped by a layer of Irish cream (e.g., Baileys or Coole Swan) which is poured over the back of a spoon so that it sits on the coffee liqueur. The ratio of coffee liqueur to Irish cream varies but is generally around 3-to-1. The resulting drink looks like a miniature pint of Guinness stout, with the coffee liqueur as the beer and the Irish cream as the head. It is normally served in a shot glass.

Some recipes call for the Irish cream to be whipped then spooned on top of the coffee liqueur in order to look more like the head on a pint of Guinness.

Variations
In some places a Baby Guinness is served with black Sambuca instead of coffee liqueur creating a drink similar to a Slippery Nipple.

In popular culture
Featured on an episode of Fine Living Network's Great Cocktails.

See also
 List of cocktails

References

External links

How to make a Baby Guiness

Shooters (drinks)
Cocktails with coffee liqueur
Cocktails with Irish cream